NGT48 (read "N.G.T. Forty-eight") is a Japanese girl group produced by Yasushi Akimoto. NGT48 is named after Niigata City of Niigata Prefecture, where the group is based. The group performs at the NGT48 Theater which is located in the fourth floor of the LoveLa2 shopping mall in Niigata City.

After then-member Maho Yamaguchi's assault in December 2018, after which she had claimed that the management had done nothing to address other NGT48 members allegedly involved in assisting her attackers, in April 2019, the NGT48 management dissolved the team system, with all current members unified according to generations.

History

2015–2018: Debut 
The creation of the group was announced on January 25, 2015 on the final, fifth day of a traditional series of AKB48 concerts entitled AKB48 Request Hour Setlist Best 1035 2015.  In October 2015, the Niigata-based company  appointed NGT48 a "bakauke PR ambassador", a PR ambassador for its product named bakauke.  As of December 2015, NGT48 is collaborating with McDonald's on a 48-piece bucket of Chicken McNuggets sold in Japan. Each bucket features photos of NGT48 and comes with a collectible card with a photo  of a random member of the group.  NGT48's own theater opened in Niigata on January 10, 2016.

The group's members are part of the cast of a television series adaptation of Higurashi When They Cry, which was premiered from May 20 on BS Sky PerfecTV!. The group also recorded the theme song for the series. It is titled "Kimi wa Doko ni Iru?" and is included on the Theater Edition of the 44th single by AKB48, "Tsubasa wa Iranai", which was released on June 1, 2016.

Their debut single, "Seishun Dokei", was released on April 12, 2017 under Ariola Japan. In 2018, Noe Yamada and Rena Hasegawa participated in the South Korean competition show Produce 48, representing NGT48. Hasegawa placed 71st and was eliminated during the first round; Yamada placed 41st and was eliminated during the second round.

2018–2019: Group restructure 

Following Maho Yamaguchi's alleged assault, during a press conference on March 29, 2019, the city of Niigata announced that they were cutting ties with NGT48 effective April, including ending their radio show, "Port de NGT." On April 11, 2019, after apologizing to the Niigata government for mishandling Yamaguchi's assault allegations, the official NGT48 website announced that the management was dissolving the team structure and reintroducing the current members as a unified "first generation" after their final performances on April 21. On April 17, Yuki Kashiwagi announced she was withdrawing from NGT48, her last performance with them being at Team NIII's concert on April 21. 

On April 21, Yamaguchi, Rena Hasegawa, and Riko Sugahara announced they were graduating from NGT48 on May 18, 2019, following the ending of Team NIII's and Team G's stages. Then, the two teams' structure of NGT48 was disbanded after their final performance of Team NIII's Hokori no Oka (誇りの丘) Stage and Team G's Saka Agari (逆上がり) Stage.

On May 21, 2019, Minami Kato was demoted to kenkyūsei after posting an Instagram story of Yamaguchi's graduation with the caption, "I'm doing my nails over here. I wish someone would change the channel." The NGT48 management also decided to halt social media posts from all members for the time being. 

On July 18, 2019, Fuka Murakumo also announced her graduation from the group, with her graduation taking place at the end of August 2019.

After seven months of inactivity, the group had its first concert on August 3, 2019, at the Tokyo Idol Festival, with plans to resume activity in the fall. On August 13, the group started their 1st stage without any teams entitled Yume wo Shinaseru Wake ni Ikanai (夢を死なせるわけにいかない), a revival stage from AKB48's Himawarigumi 2nd Stage.

On August 26, Anju Sato announced she was graduating on September 25. On February 18, 2020, Moeka Takakura announced that she will graduate from the group on March 22, 2020.

Controversies

Maho Yamaguchi assault and lawsuit

Members 

As of May 2019, according to the official website.

First generation

3rd Draft

2nd Generation

Former members

Discography

Studio albums

Singles

Other songs

Filmography

Television shows 
 HKT48 vs NGT48 Sashikita Gassen (NTV and Hulu Japan, January 12 – March 29, 2016)
 Higurashi When They Cry (SKY PerfecTV!, May 20 – June 24, 2016)
 Higurashi When They Cry Kai (SKY PerfecTV!, November 2016 – present)

See also 
 AKB48
 SKE48
 NMB48
 HKT48
 JKT48
 BNK48
 STU48
 MNL48
 SGO48

References

External links 
 

 
AKB48 Group
Japanese idol groups
Japanese girl groups
Musical groups established in 2015
2015 establishments in Japan
Musical groups from Niigata Prefecture